Grand Kru-2 is an electoral district for the elections to the House of Representatives of Liberia. The constituency covers Barclayville city, Forpoh District, Wlogba District, Dweh District, Fenetow District, Kpi District, Gee District, Buah District, Bolloh District, Dorbor District, Lower Jloh District, Upper Jloh District, Felo Jekwi District and the Barclayville-Picnicess District (except the Kpor community).

Elected representatives

References

Electoral districts in Liberia